The Skills Dat Pay da Bills is Positive K's debut album, which was released November 3, 1992. With "I Got a Man" making waves on the radio, he was doing underground compilation appearances, guest spots on other hip-hop artists' albums, and worked with emcee Big Daddy Kane on the single ("Nightshift"), which led to his album. Despite reviews calling the album more than a fluke hit, it lacked perseverance on the album charts, leading him to become a one-hit wonder. To date, the album is still beloved in the underground hip-hop community.

This album is the first recorded instance of the phrase "drop it like it's hot," which appears in the songs "Ain't No Crime" and "Minnie the Moocher."

Track listing
"Intro (Pos K Theme)"                0:57
"Pass the Mic"                       4:00
"One 2 the Head (feat. Jazzy Jay)"   4:08       
"Shakin'"                            4:57
"How the Fuck Would You Know"        5:14
"Carhoppers"                         3:29
"Nightshift"                         4:40
"Intro (Back the Fuck Up)"           1:07
"I Got a Man"                    3:52
"Ain't No Crime"                     5:02
"The Shout-Out"                      2:37
"Friends"                            4:50
"Minnie the Moocher"                 4:11
"Nightshift [Remix]"                 4:49
"A Flower Grows in Brooklyn"         4:07
"It's All Over"                      4:46

Charts
Album

Singles

References 

Island Records albums
1992 debut albums
Hip hop albums by American artists